Hans Jacob Højgaard (11 September 1904, Toftir, Faroe Islands – 10 June 1992 Tórshavn Faroe Islands) was one of the most productive composers in the Faroe Islands in the 20th century. When he was 15 years old, he went to the sea and sailed with fishing boats for four years. He took a compulsory exam in Tórshavn in 1923. In 1924, he went to Denmark, where he attended Karise Folk High School. In 1929, he received a teaching degree from the Jonstrup's Seminar. He then returned to his birthplace, Toftir. He was an assistant teacher from 1929 to 1931, a secondary teacher from 1931 to 1933, and a school director from 1934 to 1953. 

Højgaard was a chorister in Toftir and Tórshavn and composed numerous Faroese songs and hymns. Højgaard's great significance for Faroese music life is partly due to his skill and enthusiasm. He continued and refined the "ko sang" tradition that existed in the Faroe Islands as a teacher and choreographer. Højgaard's songs are distinguished by their freshness and romanticism as well as their originality. They have a style reminiscent of the peculiar tones that characterize old Faroese quadrals and hymns.

Højgaard was an honorary member of the Harbors Song Event in 1978.

Works

1951 - Føroysk Songløg I (Faroese Trad. Music Tunebook)
1977 - Føroysk Songløg II (Faroese Trad. Music Tunebook)

Recordings

1976 - LP: "Í hesi sælu jólatíð", (Faroese Christmas Carols, HJH directing his own Melodies/Compositions), HCW TÓRGARÐ
2003 - CD: "Í hesi sælu jólatíð", (Faroese Christmas Carols, HJH directing his own Melodies/Compositions), HCW TÓRGARÐ
2003 - CD: Komponisten Hans Jákup Højgaard, musikeksempel, (Musical examples of HJH Compositions) RAES, Faroese Radio
2004 - CD: Hans Jacob Højgaard 100 ár, (100-Year Anniversary) TUTL

Literature

 S. Anderssohn: Komponisten Hans Jákup Højgaard, et liv som traditionsbærer, nyskaber og lærer, Research Archive for Ethnomusicological Studies [RAES], Arendal 2003 (Danish)

References

External links 
 listen to songs her..

Faroese composers
1904 births
1992 deaths
20th-century composers
People from Toftir